Below is the list of asteroid close approaches to Earth in 2009.

Timeline of close approaches less than one lunar distance from Earth in 2009 
A list of known near-Earth asteroid close approaches less than 1 lunar distance (384,400 km or 0.00256 AU) from Earth in 2009.

 

 

 

 

 

This list does not include any of the objects that collided with earth in 2009, none of which were discovered in advance, but were recorded by sensors designed to detect detonation of nuclear devices.

Warning Times by Size 
This sub-section visualises the warning times of the close approaches listed in the above table, depending on the size of the asteroid. The sizes of the charts show the relative sizes of the asteroids to scale. For comparison, the approximate size of a person is also shown. This is based the absolute magnitude of each asteroid, an approximate measure of size based on brightness.

Abs Magnitude 29-30
 (size of a person for comparison)

Absolute Magnitude 28-29

Absolute Magnitude 27-28

Absolute Magnitude 26-27

Absolute Magnitude 25-26 (largest)

Notes

Additional examples
An example list of near-Earth asteroids that passed more than 1 lunar distance (384,400 km or 0.00256 AU) from Earth in 2009.
 (~990 meters in diameter) passed 11.33 Lunar distances (4.4 million km) from Earth on 17 January 2009.
 (~285 meters in diameter) passed 4.39 Lunar distances (1.7 million km) from Earth on 18 February 2009.
 (~41 meters in diameter) passed 2.82 Lunar distances (1.1 million km) from Earth on 17 March 2009.
 (~95 meters in diameter) passed 1.22 Lunar distances (468,000 km) from Earth on 20 March 2009.
(410777) 2009 FD (472 meters in diameter) passed 1.62 Lunar distances (624,000 km) from Earth on 27 March 2009.
(136617) 1994 CC (~990 meters in diameter) passed 6.55 Lunar distances (2.5 million km) from Earth on 10 June 2009.
2009 MU (~41 meters in diameter) passed 2.31 Lunar distances (889,000 km) from Earth on 24 June 2009.
 (~41 meters in diameter) passed 1.94 Lunar distances (745,000 km) from Earth on 11 September 2009.
 (~5 meters in diameter) may have passed as close as 1.01 Lunar distances (390,000 km) from Earth on 14 September 2009, but the nominal orbit suggests an approach nearer to 2.40 LD (922,000 km).
 (1277 meters in diameter) passed 9.79 Lunar distances (3.8 million km) from Earth on 8 October 2009.
 (~2067 meters in diameter) passed 29.68 Lunar distances (11.4 million km) from Earth on 20 October 2009.
 (~54 meters in diameter) passed 2.91 Lunar distances (112,000 km) from Earth on 1 December 2009.

See also 
List of asteroid close approaches to Earth
List of asteroid close approaches to Earth in 2008
List of asteroid close approaches to Earth in 2010

References